Siphamandla Krweqe (born 6 October 2000) is a South African cricketer. He made his List A debut for Border in the 2018–19 CSA Provincial One-Day Challenge on 30 March 2019.

References

External links
 

2000 births
Living people
South African cricketers
Border cricketers
Place of birth missing (living people)